Sagittaliseta is a subgenus of flies belonging to the family Lesser Dung flies.

Species
M. siamensis Papp, 2008

References

Sphaeroceridae
Diptera of Asia
Insect subgenera